Sudan yellow may refer to:

 Sudan Yellow 3G, a yellow azo dye
 Sudan yellow R, see Aniline Yellow
 Sudan 455, see Solvent Yellow 124